Zoran Jankovic is a Yugoslavian former football manager who managed most notably in the USL A-League.

Managerial career 
Jankovic was born in Belgrade, and emigrated to Montreal, Canada in 1991. Previously in Yugoslavia he served as the manager for FK BSK Batajnica in the 1989-90 season. Once in Canada he managed in the Ligue de Soccer Elite Quebec with Jean-Talon Rosemont. In 1996, he was named the men's soccer team head coach for Vanier College 

In 1997, he coached the Vermont Voltage in the USISL D-3 Pro League. In 2000, he was appointed the head coach for the Montreal Impact in the USL A-League. During his tenure with Montreal he brought in several imports such as Darko Kolić, Dejan Gluščević, and signed several younger players.  After four matches he was dismissed from his position due to a poor start to the season.

On March 26, 2001, Jankovic was signed as the head coach of the newly formed Montreal Dynamites in the Canadian Professional Soccer League. He brought many of his former Montreal Impact signings of the previous year. With the Dynamites he led his team to a fourth-place finish in the overall standings, and secured a playoff berth. For his achievements he was recognized with the CPSL Coach of the Year award. In 2002, Jankovic resigned from his position to become the head coach of the ARSL (Association Regionale de Soccer des Laurentides).

References  

Living people
Yugoslav football managers
Soccer people from Quebec
Montreal Impact (1992–2011) coaches
Canadian Soccer League (1998–present) managers
Year of birth missing (living people)